Marietta Robusti (1560? – 1590) was a Venetian painter of the Renaissance period.  She was the daughter of Tintoretto and is sometimes referred to as Tintoretta.

Biography
The only known primary source for details of Marietta Robusti's life is Carlo Ridolfi's Life of Tintoretto, first published in 1642, although she is mentioned briefly in Raffaelo Borghini's Il Riposo della Pitura e della Scultura of 1584. These two sources disagree on the year of her birth: according to Borghini, she was born in 1555, but Carlo Ridolfi indicates that she was born in 1560.

Marietta Robusti was probably born in 1560 and died when she was thirty during child birth. She lived in Venice all her life. She was the eldest daughter of the painter Jacopo Robusti, from whom she inherited her nickname, la Tintoretta (translated as "little dyer girl", after Jacopo's father's occupation as a tintore, or dyer).  She is thus variously known as Marietta Robusti, Marietta Tintoretto, and la Tintoretta. She was followed by three brothers and four sisters.

Since conventions of the time dictated that women remained in the privacy of the domestic sphere and were not welcome in the public world of art production and sale, Robusti and her female contemporaries gained access to the art world through their artist fathers or brothers.  Robusti's artistic training consisted of serving an apprenticeship in the collaborative environment of her father's workshop, where she probably contributed to her father's paintings with backgrounds and figure blocking, as was the usual distribution of labor in painting workshops of the time. Though Robusti's social and economic autonomy was no greater than other artisan women she had quite a following, changing the ideals of femininity within the arts. After her death, Carlo Ridolfi stated she was one of the most illustrious women of her time, having the same manner of skill as her father while displaying  "sentimental femininity, a womanly grace that is strained and resolute." While Robusti worked in her father's studio it was also said she worked on altarpieces as an assistant but her achievements were buried under the name of her father. After her death the decline in work produced by Tintoretto was ascribed to grief for his daughter, rather than the loss of a skillful assistant.

After Marietta Robusti's death she became a muse for Romantic painters such as Léon Cogniet who produced Tintoretto Painting His Dead Daughter in 1846 and Eleuterio Pagliano who painted Tintoretto and His Daughter in 1861. The trope of women artists being transformed from creators to subjects for male counterparts made her a motif for male creativity, displaying a dying muse of quietly suffering femininity.

Evidence suggests that Robusti received no commissions for major religious works such as altarpieces or other church decorations, and that she was mainly a portraitist.

Ridolfi describes Robusti's close relationship with her father at great length. Not only did she learn at his knee, as a child she also liked to dress like a boy so that she could go everywhere with Jacopo. Emperor Maximilian and King Philip II of Spain both expressed interest in hosting her as a court painter, but her father refused their invitations on her behalf because he couldn't bear to part with her.  In 1578 he arranged for her to marry a Venetian jeweler and silversmith, Jacopo Augusta, to ensure she would always stay near him. Jacopo also had Marietta instructed in singing and playing the harpsichord, clavichord, and lute.

She died of unrecorded causes in 1590, and was buried in Santa Maria del’Orto in Venice.

Attributions and assessment

The only painting that can be conclusively attributed to Marietta Robusti is her Self Portrait (c. 1580; Uffizi Gallery, Florence). This portrait depicts Marietta posed before a harpsichord, holding a musical text that has been identified as a madrigal by Philippe Verdelot, "Madonna per voi ardo".  It has been postulated that the inclusion of this text, whose opening lines are "My Lady, I burn with love for you and you do not believe it", suggests that the painting was created for a male viewer, possibly Marietta's husband.

Other attributions include: Old Man and a Boy (c. 1585; Kunsthistorisches Museum, Vienna), which was long considered one of Tintoretto's finest portraits and was not revealed to be Robusti's until 1920; Portrait of Ottavio Strada (c. 1567-68; Rijksmuseum, Amsterdam); Portrait of Two Men (Gemäldegalerie Alte Meister, Dresden), signed "MR", is thought to be Marietta Robusti's only surviving signed work.

Notes

References
 Chadwick, Whitney. Women, Art, and Society. 6th ed. London: Thames & Hudson, 2020, 22-26.
 McIver, Katherine A. "Lavinia Fontana's 'Self-Portrait Making Music'," Woman's Art Journal 19, no. 1 (Spring-Summer 1998): 3-8.
 Newton, Eric. Tintoretto. London: Longmans, Green and Co., 1952.
 Niceley, H.T. "A Door Ajar: The Professional Position of Women Artists," Art Education 45, no. 2 (Mar., 1992): 6-13.
 Ridolfi, Carlo. The Life of Tintoretto and of his children Domenico and Marietta. Translated by Catherine Enggass and Robert Enggass. University Park, PA: Pennsylvania State University Press, 1984.
 Wasmer, Marc-Joachim. Die Künstlertochter Marietta Robusti, genannt Tintoretta, in: "Unser Kopf ist rund, damit das Denken die Richtung wechseln kann." Festschrift für Franz Zelger, ed. Matthias Wohlgemut, in collaboration with Marc Fehlmann, Zurich  2001, 463–494.

External links

 Self Portrait at Scholars Resource (thumbnail)
 Portrait of Ottavio Strada at Web Gallery of Art
 Marietta Robusti in Dictionary of Painters and Engravers: Biographical and Critical by Michael Bryan
 La Renaissance- WebMuseum, Paris by Nicolas Pioch

1560s births
1590 deaths
16th-century Italian painters
Painters from Venice
Italian Renaissance painters
Italian portrait painters
Italian women painters
16th-century Venetian people
Muses
16th-century Venetian women
16th-century Italian women artists
Tintoretto